Daniel James Duran (born March 16, 1954) is a former Major League Baseball player. Duran played for the Texas Rangers in the 1981 season. In 13 games, Duran had four hits in 16 at-bats, with one run scored. He played left field, and batted and threw left-handed.

Duran is of indigenous Mexican descent. He attended Sunnyvale High School in California where he played baseball and football. He was recruited but not offered a scholarship to play college football at Stanford and offered a scholarship to play college baseball at UC Davis. He ultimately chose to attend Foothill College. During his offseasons in the minors, he worked as a carpenter.

He was drafted by the Rangers in the 30th round of the 1973 amateur draft.

References

External links

1954 births
Living people
Major League Baseball left fielders
Texas Rangers players
Baseball players from California
American expatriate baseball players in Mexico
Charleston Charlies players
Gastonia Rangers players
Gulf Coast Rangers players
Lynchburg Rangers players
Pittsfield Rangers players
San Antonio Brewers players
Tecolotes de Nuevo Laredo players
Tucson Toros players
Tulsa Drillers players
Wichita Aeros players
Junior college baseball players in the United States
American baseball players of Mexican descent
American people of Indigenous Mexican descent